Badhara Mirchaiya  is a village development committee in Siraha District in the Sagarmatha Zone of Southeastern Nepal. It contains seven villages. It has 9 Wada.

Demographics 
At the time of the 2011 Nepal census, it had a population of 16,482 people living in 3,346 individual households. The village contains Hindus, Muslims, Buddhists and Christians, predominantly Hindu. Local castes include Brahman, Chhetri, Teli, Yadav, Suri, Koiri, Haluwai, Danuwar, Kumal (Mukhiya) Tatama and Musahara people live there.

Administration 
Badhara Mirchaiya is included in Karjanha (rural municipality).

Geography 
The hills of Chure range are there. It is a mixture of hilly and Terai region. Babataal, Nandmohari, the Kamala River and the Kamala Bridge are local attractions.

References

External links
UN map of the municipalities of  Siraha District

Populated places in Siraha District